Juan Márquez (1565–1621) was a Spanish ascetic writer.  He studied at the University of Toledo and was professor of theology at Salamanca. He was appointed preacher of King Philip III of Spain. Márquez wrote Origins of the Hermit Friars of the Order of Saint Augustine and Their True Establishment Before the Great Lateran Council, published at Salamanca in Spanish in 1618.

Spanish male writers
1565 births
1621 deaths